Hugla is an island in the municipality of Nesna in Nordland county, Norway.  The  island lies south of the islands of Tomma and Handnesøya, west of the mainland of Nesna, east of the island of Løkta, and north of the Ranfjorden.  The residents of the island live mostly on the eastern coast, across the fjord from the village of Nesna.

See also
List of islands of Norway

References

Islands of Nordland
Nesna